The Years Between may refer to:

The Years Between (play), a play by Daphne du Maurier
The Years Between (film), a 1946 British film based on the play